António Xavier Pereira Coutinho (11 June 1851 - 27 March 1939) was a Portuguese botanist and agronomist, born in Santo Estêvão, Lisbon. He published two editions of The Flora of Portugal, and is the scientific authority for a hundred plant taxa, across many families. He died at Alcabideche, aged 87

Publications

References

External links
 
 Fotografia Photograph of A. X. Pereira Coutinho
 O Distrito de Bragança numa carta de D. A. X. Pereira Coutinho

1851 births
1939 deaths
People from Lisbon
Academic staff of the University of Lisbon
19th-century Portuguese botanists
Portuguese agronomists
20th-century Portuguese botanists